Bilari is a village in Gorakhpur, Uttar Pradesh, India. For the same-named city, go to Bilari.

References

Villages in Gorakhpur district